Anaga was one of the 9 menceyatos guanches (native kingdoms) in which was divided the island of Tenerife (Canary Islands, Spain) before the arrival of the conquering Spaniards. 

The area of the menceyato is now part of the  municipalities of Santa Cruz de Tenerife and San Cristóbal de La Laguna. The easternmost kingdom of the island, Anaga opposed a firm resistance against the Spaniards, under mencey Beneharo.

References

External links 
 Menceyatos de Tenerife

Anaga
Former kingdoms